Jacob Gaster (6 October 1907–12 March 2007), known as Jack Gaster, was a British communist solicitor and politician.

Biography
Born in Maida Vale, Jack was the son of Moses Gaster, the leader of the Sephardic Jewish Congregation in London, and Lucy Friedlander.  He studied at the London School of Economics and then entered a legal career, qualifying as a solicitor in 1931, and soon thereafter forming a socialist law practice with Richard Turner.

In 1926, Gaster joined the Independent Labour Party (ILP), inspired by its support for workers during the British General Strike.  He became prominent in the party, and was its representative at the arrival of the Jarrow March in London.  However, he was a champion of unity with the Communist Party of Great Britain (CPGB), and to this end was a founder of the ILP's Revolutionary Policy Committee.  The Committee successfully persuaded the ILP to disaffiliate from the Labour Party, but could not convince members to merge with the CPGB.  As a result, in 1935, he joined the majority of the Committee in resigning from the ILP and joining the CPGB.

Gaster joined the British Army during World War II.  He was posted to the Royal Sussex Regiment and was watched closely by British intelligence.  However, he was injured in training and instead spent the war educating illiterate soldiers.

In 1946, Gaster was elected to the London County Council in Mile End, alongside fellow communist Ted Bramley.  However, he lost the seat in 1949, and was again unsuccessful in 1952.  He subsequently acted as the principal legal consul to the CPGB, and became a vice-president of the Haldane Society of Socialist Lawyers.

During the Korean War, Gaster travelled to the North to study the situation, as part of an international legal team.  The group produced a report covering a range of issues, including the conditions for prisoners of war, but were heavily criticised for their allegations of germ warfare by the United States.

Gaster remained a prominent communist solicitor until he retired in 1990, and an activist in the CPGB until it was disbanded in 1991, a decision with which he strongly disagreed.  He subsequently joined the Socialist Labour Party, but soon left, later re-joining and then again resigning.  He spent much of his retirement in support of the Marx Memorial Library.

References

1907 births
2007 deaths
Communist Party of Great Britain councillors
English Jews
English solicitors
Jewish British politicians
Jewish socialists
Independent Labour Party National Administrative Committee members
Members of London County Council
People from Maida Vale
Socialist Labour Party (UK) members
Alumni of the London School of Economics
20th-century English lawyers